The Epistle of Ignatius to the Magnesians (often abbreviated Magnesians or Ign. Mag.) is an epistle attributed to Ignatius of Antioch, a second-century bishop of Antioch, and addressed to the church in Magnesia on the Maeander. It was written during Ignatius' transport from Antioch to his execution in Rome.

Composition

Magnesians is one of seven epistles attributed to Ignatius that are generally accepted as authentic. In 5th century, this collection was enlarged by spurious letters.

It is clear that Magnesians was written soon before the martyrdom of Ignatius, but it is uncertain when precisely this martyrdom occurred. Tradition places the martyrdom of Ignatius in the reign of Trajan, who was emperor of Rome from 98 to 117 AD. While many scholars accept the traditional dating of Ignatius' martyrdom under Trajan, others have argued for a somewhat later date. Richard Pervo dated Ignatius' death to 135-140 AD, and British classicist Timothy Barnes has argued for a date some time in the 140s AD.

Background
The Magnesian and Trallian churches had sent their bishops, Polybius of Trallis and Damas, in company with two presbyters from Magnesia to meet Ignatius who was being held at the nearby port of Smyrna on his way to execution in Rome, and Ignatius writes his letter to thank the Magnesian church.

Content
The epistle calls for unity and submission in the church. Ignatius also cautions against "false doctrines." In particular, he attacks those Jewish Christians who continued to observe the Torah:

He also advocates the idea that Christians should observe the Lord's Day every Sunday, rather than the Jewish Sabbath on Saturdays:

References

2nd-century Christian texts
Apocryphal epistles
Letters (message)
Works by the Church Fathers